CBS is an American broadcast television network owned and operated by Paramount Global, which originated as a radio network in September 1927, and expanded into television in July 1941. The network currently has 15 owned-and-operated stations, and current affiliation agreements with 236 other television stations.

This article is a listing of current CBS affiliates in the continental United States and United States possessions (including subchannel affiliates, satellite stations and select low-power stations translators), arranged alphabetically by state, and based on the stations city of license and followed in parentheses by the Designated Market Area if it differs from the city of license. There are links to and articles on each of the stations, describing their histories, local programming and technical information, such as broadcast frequencies.

The station's advertised channel number follows the call letters. In most cases, this is their virtual channel (PSIP) number.

Stations listed in boldface are owned and operated by CBS through its subsidiary CBS News and Stations (excluding owned-and-operated stations of The CW or independent stations owned by the group, unless the station simulcasts a co-owned CBS O&O station via a digital subchannel).

United States

Alabama
 Birmingham – WIAT 42
 Dothan – WTVY 4
 Huntsville – WHNT-TV 19
 Mobile – WKRG-TV 5
 Selma (Montgomery) – WAKA 8

Alaska
Some CBS programming is broadcast on the Alaska Rural Communications Service (ARCS).
 Anchorage – KAUU 5
 Fairbanks – KXDF-CD 13
 Ketchikan – KYES 5 (simulcast of KAUU)
 Sitka – KTNL-TV 7

Arizona
 Phoenix – KPHO-TV 5
 Tucson – KOLD-TV 13
 Yuma – KYMA-DT 13

Arkansas

 Fort Smith – KFSM-TV 5
 Jonesboro – KJNB-LD2 39.2/KJNE-LD2 42.2
 Little Rock – KTHV 11

California
 Bakersfield – KBAK-TV 29
 Chico – KHSL-TV 12
 Eureka – KVIQ-LD 14
 Fresno – KGPE-TV 47
 Los Angeles – KCBS-TV 2
 Monterey – KION-TV 46
 Palm Springs – KESQ-DT2 42.2/KPSP-CD 38
 San Diego – KFMB-TV 8
 San Francisco – KPIX-TV 5
 Santa Barbara – KEYT-DT2 3.2
 Stockton (Sacramento) – KOVR 13

Colorado
 Colorado Springs – KKTV 11
 Denver – KCNC-TV 4
 Durango – KREZ-TV 6 (satellite of KRQE-TV, Albuquerque, New Mexico)
 Grand Junction – KREX-TV 5
 Montrose – KREY-TV 10 (satellite of KREX-TV)

Connecticut
 Hartford – WFSB 3

Delaware
 None; served by KYW-TV Philadelphia and WBOC-TV Salisbury, MD

District of Columbia
 Washington, D.C. – WUSA 9

Florida
 Fort Myers – WINK-TV 11
 High Springs (Gainesville) – WGFL 28
 Jacksonville – WJAX-TV 47
 Miami – WFOR-TV 4
 Orlando – WKMG-TV 6
 Panama City – WECP-LD 21/WJHG-DT3 7.3
 St. Petersburg (Tampa) – WTSP 10
 Tallahassee – WCTV 6
 West Palm Beach – WPEC 12

Georgia
 Atlanta – WANF 46
 Augusta – WRDW-TV 12 
 Columbus – WRBL 3
 Macon – WMAZ-TV 13
 Savannah – WTOC-TV 11
 Thomasville (Tallahassee, Florida) – WCTV 6
 Valdosta (Albany) – WSWG 44

Hawaii
 Hilo - KSIX-DT3 13.3 (satellite of KGMB)
 Honolulu – KGMB 5
 Wailuku – KOGG-DT2 13.2 (satellite of KGMB)

Idaho
 Boise – KBOI-TV 2
 Idaho Falls – KIFI-DT2 8.2
 Lewiston – KLEW-TV 3
 Twin Falls – KMVT 11

Illinois
 Champaign – WCIA 3
 Chicago – WBBM-TV 2
 Chicago - WMEU-CD 48.3 (Simulcast of WBBM-TV)
 Peoria – WMBD-TV 31
 Rock Island (Quad Cities) – WHBF-TV 4 / KGCW-TV 26.4
 Rockford – WIFR-LD 23
 Springfield – WCIX 49.2 (simulcast of WCIA)

Indiana
 Bloomington (Indianapolis) – WTTV 4
 Evansville – WEVV-TV 44
 Fort Wayne – WANE-TV 15
 Kokomo (Indianapolis) – WTTK 29 (satellite of WTTV; ATSC 3.0 TV Station) / WXIN (ATSC 1.0 Simulcast)
 Lafayette – WLFI-TV 18
 South Bend – WSBT-TV 22
 Terre Haute – WTHI-TV 10

Iowa
 Cedar Rapids – KGAN 2
 Des Moines – KCCI 8
 Mason City (Rochester, Minnesota) – KIMT 3
 Sioux City – KPTH 44.3

Kansas
 Ensign (Dodge City) – KBSD-DT 6 (satellite of KWCH-DT)
 Goodland – KBSL-DT 10 (satellite of KWCH-DT)
 Hays – KBSH-DT 7 (satellite of KWCH-DT)
 Hutchinson (Wichita) – KWCH-DT 12
 Pittsburg (Joplin, Missouri) – KOAM-TV 7
 Topeka – WIBW-TV 13

Kentucky
 Bowling Green – WNKY-DT2 40.2
 Hazard – WYMT-TV 57 (semi-satellite of WKYT-TV)
 Lexington – WKYT-TV 27
 Louisville – WLKY-TV 32

Louisiana
 Alexandria – KALB-DT2 5.2
 Baton Rouge – WAFB 9
 Lafayette – KLFY-TV 10
 Lake Charles -- KSWL-LD 17
 Monroe – KNOE-TV 8
 New Orleans – WWL-TV 4
 Shreveport – KSLA 12

Maine
 Bangor – WABI-TV 5
 Portland – WGME-TV 13
 Presque Isle – WAGM-TV 8

Maryland
 Baltimore – WJZ-TV 13
 Salisbury – WBOC-TV 16

Massachusetts
 Boston – WBZ-TV 4
 Springfield – WSHM-LD 3.5 (semi-satellite of WFSB/Hartford, Connecticut)

Michigan
 Alpena – WBKB-TV 11
 Bay City (Flint) – WNEM-TV 5
 Cadillac (Traverse City) – WWTV 9
 Detroit – WWJ-TV 62
 Kalamazoo (Grand Rapids) – WWMT 3
 Lansing – WLNS-TV 6
 Marquette – WZMQ-DT2 19.2
 Sault Ste. Marie – WWUP-TV 10 (satellite of WWTV)

Minnesota
 Chisholm – KRII-DT2 11.2 (simulcast of KBJR-DT2)
 Mankato – KEYC-TV 12
 Minneapolis – WCCO-TV 4
 Walker – KCCW-TV 12 (satellite of WCCO-TV)

Mississippi
 Biloxi – WLOX-DT2 13.2
 Columbus (Tupelo) – WCBI-TV 4
 Cleveland (Greenville) – WXVT-LD 17
 Hattiesburg – WHLT 22
 Jackson – WJTV 12
 Meridian – WMDN 24

Missouri
 Cape Girardeau (Paducah, Kentucky) – KFVS-TV 12
 Hannibal (Quincy, Illinois) – KHQA-TV 7
 Jefferson City (Columbia) – KRCG 13
 Kansas City – KCTV 5
 Kirksville (Ottumwa, Iowa) – KTVO-DT2 3.2
 St. Joseph – KCJO-LD 30 / KNPN-LD2 26.2
 St. Louis – KMOV 4
 Springfield – KOLR 10

Montana
Montana Television Network: statewide network consisting of 7 stations
 Billings – KTVQ 2
 Bozeman – KBZK 7 (satellite of KXLF-TV)
 Butte – KXLF-TV 4
 Glendive – KXGN-TV 5 (not owned by MTN)
 Great Falls – KRTV 3
 Helena – KXLH-LP 9 (satellite of KRTV)
 Kalispell – KAJJ-CA 18 (repeater of KPAX-TV)
 Missoula – KPAX-TV 8

Nebraska
 Grand Island – KGIN 11 (satellite of KOLN-TV)
 Lincoln – KOLN 10
 Omaha – KMTV-TV 3
 Scottsbluff – KSTF-TV 10 (satellite of KGWN-TV, Cheyenne, Wyoming)

Nevada
 Las Vegas – KLAS-TV 8
 Reno – KTVN 2

New Hampshire
 None; served by WBZ-TV Boston, WGME-TV Portland, ME and WCAX-TV Burlington, VT

New Jersey
 None; served by WCBS-TV New York and KYW-TV Philadelphia

New Mexico 
 Albuquerque – KRQE 13
 Roswell – KBIM-TV 10 (satellite of KRQE)

New York
 Binghamton – WBNG-TV 12
 Buffalo – WIVB-TV 4
 Carthage (Watertown) – WWNY-TV 7
 Elmira – WENY-DT2 36.2
 New York City – WCBS-TV 2
 Rochester – WROC-TV 8
 Schenectady (Albany) – WRGB 6
 Syracuse – WTVH 5
 Utica - WKTV-DT2 2.2

North Carolina
 Charlotte – WBTV 3
 Goldsboro (Raleigh) – WNCN 17
 Greensboro – WFMY-TV 2
 Greenville – WNCT-TV 9
 Wilmington – WWAY-DT2 3.2

North Dakota
 Bismarck – KXMB-TV 12
 Dickinson – KXMA-DT2 2.2 (semi-satellite of KXMB-TV)
 Fargo – KXJB-LD 30/KVLY-TV 11.2
 Minot – KXMC-TV 13
 Williston – KXMD-TV 11 (semi-satellite of KXMC-TV)

Ohio
 Cincinnati – WKRC-TV 12
 Columbus – WBNS-TV 10
 Dayton – WHIO-TV 7
 Lima – WOHL-CD2 35.2 / WAMS-LD 35
 Shaker Heights (Cleveland) – WOIO 19
 Toledo – WTOL-TV 11
 Youngstown – WKBN-TV 27

Oklahoma
 Oklahoma City – KWTV-DT 9
 Tulsa – KOTV-DT 6

Oregon
 Bend – KBNZ-LD 7
 Coos Bay – KCBY 11 (satellite of KVAL-TV)
 Eugene – KVAL-TV 13
 Medford – KTVL 10
 Portland – KOIN 6
 Roseburg – KPIC 4 (satellite of KVAL-TV)

Pennsylvania
 Altoona – WTAJ-TV 10
 Erie – WSEE-TV 35
 Harrisburg – WHP-TV 21
 Philadelphia – KYW-TV 3
 Pittsburgh – KDKA-TV 2
 Scranton – WYOU 22

Rhode Island
 Providence – WPRI-TV 12

South Carolina
 Charleston – WCSC-TV 5
 Columbia – WLTX 19
 Florence (Myrtle Beach) – WBTW 13
 Spartanburg (Greenville) – WSPA-TV 7

South Dakota
 Florence – KDLO-TV 3 (satellite of KELO-TV)
 Rapid City – KCLO-TV 15 (satellite of KELO-TV)
 Reliance – KPLO-TV 6 (satellite of KELO-TV)
 Sioux Falls – KELO-TV 11

Tennessee
 Chattanooga – WDEF-TV 12
 Jackson – WBBJ-DT3 7.3
 Johnson City (Tri-Cities, Tennessee-Virginia) – WJHL-TV 11
 Knoxville – WVLT-TV 8
 Memphis – WREG-TV 3
 Nashville – WTVF 5

Texas
 Abilene – KTAB-TV 32
 Amarillo – KFDA-TV 10
 Austin – KEYE-TV 42
 Beaumont – KFDM 6
 Brownsville (Rio Grande Valley) – KVEO-DT2 23.2
 Bryan – KBTX-TV 3 (semi-satellite of KWTX-TV)
 Corpus Christi – KZTV 10
 El Paso – KDBC-TV 4
 Fort Worth (Dallas) – KTVT 11
 Houston – KHOU 11
 Laredo – KYLX-LD 13
 Lubbock – KLBK-TV 13
 Nacogdoches (Tyler) – KYTX 19
 Odessa (Midland) – KOSA-TV 7
 San Angelo – KLST 8
 San Antonio – KENS 5
 Sherman – KXII 12
 Victoria – KXTS-LD 41
 Waco – KWTX-TV 10
 Wichita Falls – KAUZ-TV 6

Utah
 Salt Lake City – KUTV 2

Vermont
 Burlington – WCAX-TV 3

Virginia
 Charlottesville – WCAV 19
 Harrisonburg  – WSVF-CD2 43.2
 Norfolk – WTKR 3
 Richmond – WTVR-TV 6
 Roanoke – WDBJ 7

Washington
 Pasco (Kennewick) – KEPR-TV 19
 Seattle – KIRO-TV 7
 Spokane – KREM 2
 Yakima – KIMA-TV 29

West Virginia
 Huntington – WOWK-TV 13
 Lewisburg (Bluefield) – WVNS-TV 59
 Moorefield - W50BD-D¹ 50
 Parkersburg – WIYE-LD 26 / WTAP-TV 15.2
 Weston (Clarksburg) – WDTV 5
 Wheeling – WTRF-TV 7

¹ W50BD-D is a translator licensed to Valley Television Cooperative, Inc. which rebroadcasts CBS programming from Tegna Media's WUSA-TV in Washington, D.C.

Wisconsin
 Green Bay – WFRV-TV 5
 La Crosse – WKBT-DT 8
 Madison – WISC-TV 3
 Milwaukee – WDJT-TV 58
 Superior (Duluth, Minnesota) - KBJR-DT2 6.2
 Wausau – WSAW-TV 7

Wyoming
 Casper – KGWC-TV 14 
 Cheyenne – KGWN-TV 5
 Lander – KGWL-TV 5 (satellite of KGWC)
 Rock Springs – KGWR-TV 13 (satellite of KGWC)

CBS stations outside the 50 states

U.S. possessions

Guam
 Hagatna – KUAM-DT2 8.2

Puerto Rico
 CBS Puerto Rico¹
¹ CBS Puerto Rico is a cable-only feed of Lilly Broadcasting's WSEE-TV in Erie, Pennsylvania.

U.S. Virgin Islands
 Christiansted – WCVI-TV 23

Bermuda
 Hamilton – ZBM-TV 9

St. Vincent and the Grenadines
 Kingstown – ZBG-TV 9

See also
 List of CBS television affiliates (table)
 List of former CBS television affiliates
 Lists of ABC television affiliates
 Lists of CBS television affiliates
 Lists of NBC television affiliates

References

CBS